Cops is a 1922 American two-reel silent  comedy film about a young man (Buster Keaton) who accidentally gets on the bad side of the entire Los Angeles Police Department during a parade and is chased all over town.  It was written and directed by Edward F. Cline and Keaton.

Background and plot 

This very Kafka-esque film was filmed during the rape-and-murder trial of Fatty Arbuckle, a circumstance that may have influenced the short's tone of hopeless ensnarement. Even though the central character's intentions are good, he cannot win, no matter how inventively he tries. He gets into various scraps with police officers throughout the film. Eventually, he unwittingly throws a bomb into a police parade and ends up being chased by a horde of cops.

At the end of the film, Keaton's character locks up the cops in the police station. However, the girl he is trying to woo disapproves of his behavior and gives him the cold shoulder. Therefore, he unlocks the police station and is immediately pulled in by the cops. The film ends with the title "The End" written on a tombstone with Keaton's pork pie hat propped on it.

One of Keaton's most iconic and brilliantly-constructed short films, Cops was deemed "culturally, historically, or aesthetically significant" by the United States Library of Congress and selected for preservation in their National Film Registry in 1997.

Cast
 Buster Keaton as The Young Man
 Joe Roberts as Police Chief
 Virginia Fox as Mayor's Daughter
 Edward F. Cline as Hobo
 Steve Murphy as Conman selling furniture (uncredited)

See also
 Buster Keaton filmography
 List of United States comedy films
 1922 in film

References

External links

Cops essay by Randy Haberkamp  at National Film Registry 
Cops essay by Daniel Eagan in America's Film Legacy: The Authoritative Guide to the Landmark Movies in the National Film Registry, A&C Black, 2010 , pages 81–83 

 
 
 Cops at the International Buster Keaton Society
 Article at InDigest Magazine about the film recently being scored by guitarist Steve Kimock

1922 films
1922 comedy films
1922 short films
American silent short films
Silent American comedy films
American black-and-white films
Articles containing video clips
First National Pictures films
Films directed by Buster Keaton
Films directed by Edward F. Cline
Films produced by Joseph M. Schenck
Films with screenplays by Buster Keaton
Surviving American silent films
United States National Film Registry films
1920s American films